The Little Llangothlin Nature Reserve is a protected wetland nature reserve that is located on the Northern Tablelands in the New England region of New South Wales, in eastern Australia.

The reserve contains the  Little Llangothlin Lagoon, part of the smaller Billy Bung Lagoon, and was established in 1979 under the NSW National Parks and Wildlife Act 1974. In 1996 the reserve was designated a wetland of international importance under the Ramsar Convention. It, with the adjacent area of Bagot Road, is also listed on Australia’s Register of the National Estate.

Description
The Little Llangothlin Nature Reserve has some of the last high-elevation freshwater lagoons on basalt soil on the New England Tableland. The reserve is situated in an area that has lost most of its vegetation to create arable land. It thus serves as a refuge for numerous species of birds, mammals, amphibians and reptiles.

It protects a still largely natural example of a high-elevation lake, most of which have been cleared or severely modified in the region. The lagoon fills a natural depression in the tableland landscape; a former agricultural drainage ditch has been filled in to restore its original water depth of about  when full. The vegetation includes sedgeland, herbland and grassy woodland. Trees include New England peppermints, snowgums and silver wattles. The rare Hairy Anchor Plant and Austral Toadflax are found there. The wetlands of the reserve form a drought refuge for many kinds of waterbirds as well as supporting several species of frogs and reptiles. A  walking track encircles the lagoon.

See also

 Protected areas of New South Wales

References

External links

Wetlands of New South Wales
Ramsar sites in Australia
Northern Tablelands
Nature reserves in New South Wales
Lakes of New South Wales
New South Wales places listed on the defunct Register of the National Estate
1979 establishments in Australia
Protected areas established in 1979
Armidale Regional Council